Saint-Émile or Saint-Emile can mean:
Saint Emile was martyred in Carthage in the mid-third century and his feast day is May 22.
Saint-Émile, Quebec City, a former city in central Quebec, Canada, now amalgamated into Quebec City 
Saint-Émile-de-Suffolk, Quebec, a municipality in the Outaouais region of Quebec, Canada
Saint Emile Island